Monika Hojnisz (born 27 August 1991), now Monika Hojnisz-Staręga, is a Polish biathlete. She competes in the Biathlon World Cup. Hojnisz won a bronze medal at the Biathlon World Championships 2013 (12.5 km mass start). In December 2018 she scored her best World Cup finish, taking second place in the 15 km individual at the Pokljuka round of the World Cup. She finished sixth in the 15 km individual at the 2018 Winter Olympics in Pyeongchang.

She married Polish cross-county skier Maciej Staręga in June 2019.

Biathlon results
All results are sourced from the International Biathlon Union.

Olympic Games
0 medals

*The mixed relay was added as an event in 2014.

World Championships
1 medal (1 bronze)

*During Olympic seasons competitions are only held for those events not included in the Olympic program.
**The single mixed relay was added as an event in 2019.

World Cup

References

External links
 IBU profile

1991 births
Living people
Polish female biathletes
Sportspeople from Chorzów
Biathlon World Championships medalists
Biathletes at the 2014 Winter Olympics
Biathletes at the 2018 Winter Olympics
Biathletes at the 2022 Winter Olympics
Olympic biathletes of Poland
Universiade medalists in biathlon
Universiade silver medalists for Poland
Competitors at the 2013 Winter Universiade